Timothy John Rossovich (March 14, 1946 – December 6, 2018) was an American football linebacker and a television and movie actor, active from 1977 to 1998. He was the brother of actor Rick Rossovich.

Biography 
Rossovich was born in Palo Alto, California. He played college football at the University of Southern California and was one of five USC Trojans players taken in the first round of the 1968 NFL Draft after his senior year. Rossovich played for the National Football League Philadelphia Eagles, San Diego Chargers, and Houston Oilers between 1968 and 1976. He played in the Pro Bowl in 1969.

In March 1974, he was selected by the Philadelphia Bell in the first round (3rd overall) of the WFL Pro Draft. He opted to sign with the Philadelphia Bell of the World Football League, where he played until the league folded midway through the 1975 season.

In 1977, Rossovich appeared in the episode "The Shortest Yard" of the ABC situation comedy The San Pedro Beach Bums.

Rossovich died due to respiratory arrest on December 6, 2018, in Grass Valley, California.

Filmography

References

External links 
 Tim Rossovich (statistics) – Pro-Football-Reference.com.
 
 Underwood, John "He's Burning To Be A Success" Sports Illustrated, September 20, 1971

1946 births
2018 deaths
Male actors from Palo Alto, California
Sportspeople from Palo Alto, California
Players of American football from California
All-American college football players
American male film actors
American male television actors
Eastern Conference Pro Bowl players
Philadelphia Eagles players
USC Trojans football players